Jefferson Andrés Lerma Solís (born 25 October 1994) is a Colombian professional footballer who plays as a central midfielder for  club AFC Bournemouth and the Colombia national team. He has also been used as a defensive midfielder and as a right-back.

A youth product of Atlético Huila, Lerma played for three years in Colombia before joining Spanish side Levante on loan in 2016. That same year, Levante bought Lerma outright on a four-year contract. Lerma became Premier League side AFC Bournemouth's club record transfer fee in 2018 as he joined The Cherries for a reported €30 million.

Lerma first played with Colombia's Olympic team, representing them at the 2016 Summer Olympics in Rio. He made his international debut for Colombia the following year in a friendly against South Korea. He was part of the Colombia squad that participated at the 2018 World Cup, and represented his nation at the 2019 edition of the Copa América.

Club career

Atlético Huila

2013 Apertura and Clausura 
Born in El Cerrito, Valle del Cauca, Lerma relocated to Neiva, Huila and graduated with Atlético Huila's youth setup. After being promoted to the main squad in January 2013, he made his professional debut on 30 March, starting in a 0–0 home draw against Millonarios. On 17 April, Lerma provided the assist for Huila's third goal against Independiente Medellín which allowed his team to win 3–2. On the final match day, Lerma made his second direct contribution of the season, distributing an assist in a 1–1 home draw against Santa Fe. Lerma appeared in 20 matches during his first professional season, as his side finished 13th in the Apertura.

For the 2013 Clausura, Lerma's side avoided a relegation play-off, finishing in 14th place with two points more than Cúcuta Deportivo who were relegated after losing their play-off series against second division side Fortaleza.

2014 Apertura and Clausura
He scored his first professional goals on 6 February 2014, scoring a brace in a 3–1 home success over newly promoted Fortaleza, the first of which was the club's 1,000th. Lerma netted his third goal of the season on 10 April in a 2–0 home win over Once Caldas. Although Lerma's goal secured an important victory, Huila failed to qualify for the Apertura's final phase after they lost away at Santa Fe and tied at home with Uniautónoma in their remaining matches, thus resulting in a 12th place finish.

Lerma suffered the first red card of his career on 2 August 2014, after receiving a second booking in the 45th minute during a Clausura match against Fortaleza. On October 20, Lerma scored a vital goal in a 3–0 win against Deportivo Pasto. Huila ultimately qualified to the 2014 Clausura's final phase, and eventually fell short from disputing the final despite having the same amount of points as group counter-part Santa Fe, who would go on to dispute and win the final against Independiente Medellín.

2015 Apertura
Lerma would maintain his consistency during the 2015 Apertura, guiding Huila to a surprising first place finish in the league table, thus qualifying for the Apertura's quarter-finals against Deportes Tolima. However, Huila was knocked-out by Tolima with Lerma missing out on both games due to injury. Overall, that season Lerma would establish himself as key integrant for Atlético Huila, which attracted the interest of European clubs such as Spanish side Levante. Despite rumours of a potential loan to Spain, Lerma was included in Huila's squad for the initial part of 2015 Clausura. On 8 August, he scored a goal during his last game for Huila from free-kick in a 2–1 away defeat to Deportes Tolima.

Levante UD

2015–16 season and relegation

While disputing the 2016 Summer Olympics with Colombia on August 13, Lerma agreed to a one-year loan contract with La Liga club Levante. He made his debut later that month, replacing Nabil Ghilas in a 0–0 away draw to Las Palmas. Lerma incorporated himself quickly to Levante's team dynamics, and scored his first goal in the main category of Spanish football on 7 December 2015, scoring the match's first goal in a 1–1 away draw with Espanyol. He provided an assist to Deyverson on 25 February, 2016, which helped Levante win their home duel against Las Palmas 3–2. After appearing in 25 matches for the club, he signed a four-year contract effective 1 July 2016 for a €600,000 transfer fee. He provided a further assist during his debut season for Levante in a match against Athletic Bilbao on 24 April, which ended 2–2. On 2 May, Lerma and his team suffered relegation to the second division after a defeat to Málaga CF which left Levante with no mathematical possibility of avoiding relegation. Overall, Lerma finished the season with 34 appearances, one goal, and two assists across all competitions.

2016–17 season and promotion to La Liga
Lerma made his Segunda División debut on 4 September 2016, coming off the bench in a 1–1 away draw against Gimnàstic. On 2 October, he received a double-booking during Levante's 3–2 victory over Real Valladolid. On 15 October, Lerma guided Levante to an important victory against Mallorca, where he scored Levante's second goal in a 2–1 triumph. He provided the assist for Roger Martí's ninth goal of the season during Levante's 0–3 away victory against CD Mirandés. On 11 January 2017, Lerma scored his first goal of the year, Levante's second in a 0–2 away win against UCAM Murcia CF. In early April, a torn muscle injury would rule Lerma out for six league games. On 13 May, he made his return as a starter during Levante's 2–1 home win over Girona. After a well-fought season, Levante finished first and were crowned as the champions for the 2016–17 Segunda División season, thus achieving direct promotion to La Liga.

2017–18 season
On 21 August 2017, he made his return to the top-flight of Spanish football at home against Villareal CF, where Lerma played the entire match as his team secured a 1–0 victory. Throughout the first half of the season, a muscle injury would ultimately prevent Lerma from disputing nine league matches. On 26 February 2018, Lerma made his return upon recovery against Real Betis. On 31 March, Lerma provided an assist for José Luis Morales' decisive equalizing goal against Girona away from home. On 13 May, Lerma took part in Levante's historic win against FC Barcelona, which ended 5–4 at Levante's Estadi Ciutat de València. Lerma's team eventually finished 15th at the end of the season, thus maintaining a spot in Spain's top flight.

AFC Bournemouth

2018–19 season
On 7 August 2018, Lerma joined Premier League club AFC Bournemouth for a club record transfer fee of €30 million. On 1 September, he made his debut for Bournemouth playing 88 minutes in a 2–0 loss against Chelsea. On 1 October during a league match against Crystal Palace, Lerma was fouled in the penalty area which resulted in a penalty being award to Bournemouth. Junior Stanislas successfully converted the decisive penalty which helped Bournemouth win the match 2–1. Lerma scored his first goal for the club in a 2–1 defeat against Newcastle United on 10 November 2018. He scored on the final day of his first season at the club in a 5–3 defeat away to Crystal Palace. Lerma established himself as a fan favourite player, due to his tough-tackling, no-nonsense style of play, as well as an important part of the Bournemouth team during his first season in the Premier League; making a total of 32 appearances across all competitions and scoring two goals in the league. Conclusively, Bournemouth would end the Premier League season in 13th place.

2019–20 season and relegation to the Championship
On 14 December 2019, Lerma provided a crucial assist for Dan Gosling's sole goal to help Bournemouth beat Chelsea 0–1 at Stamford Bridge. On 29 February 2020, he scored his third goal for the club in a 2–2 home draw against Chelsea, meeting a Ryan Fraser corner with his head to make the score 1–1. Lerma added his second assist of the season against Liverpool at Anfield, aiding Callum Wilson to lead 0–1 in the ninth minute. Despite the team's efforts, Bournemouth would finish losing 2–1, thus pushing the team down to 18th place. Lerma's side would ultimately suffer relegation to the Championship at the second of the season after finishing in 19th place.

2020–21 season
On the opening match-day, Lerma scored Bournemouth's second to help his side win 3–2 against Blackburn Rovers. He made another notable contribution on 27 September 2020, providing Arnaut Danjuma with an important assist to help win the match 1–0 against Norwich City. For the following fixture, Lerma scored Bournemouth's first against Coventry City which ended in a 1–3 away win. In December, Lerma was charged with a biting offence relating to an act of violent conduct during a game against Sheffield Wednesday on 3 November 2020. On 12 December, Lerma provided a further assist for Dominic Solanke's 8th league goal, during Bournemouth's 5–0 thrashing over Huddersfield Town. He received his first red card as a Bournemouth player for violent conduct on 16 January 2021, during Bournemouth's eventual 0–1 loss at home against Luton Town. On 2 April, Lerma completed his third goal of season in Bournemouth's 3–1 win against Middlesbrough. Ultimately, Bournemouth finished the season in fifth, therefore qualifying to the Championship play-offs against Brentford. Despite winning the first leg 1–0, Bournemouth would suffer a 3–1 away defeat in the second leg, thus failing to gain promotion to the Premier League.

2021–22 season and promotion to the Premier League
On 28 August 2021, Lerma started his first game of the season in a goal less draw away at Hull City. Lerma would be a fundamental component for Bournemouth's team dynamic during their 15 game unbeaten run. On 21 November, Lerma made his first assist of the season, providing team-mate Solanke's 14th of the season during Bournemouth's 3–2 away defeat against Derby County. On 27 November, Lerma received a straight red card during Bournemouth's 2–2 draw against Coventry City. He missed out on three league games as a result. He suffered his second red card of the season during his side's 3–1 win against Birmingham City. Consequently, Lerma was suspended for four league matches. On 12 March, Lerma made his return from suspension against Derby County, with his team winning 2–0. Lerma effectively partnered up with Solanke once more on 15 March, when he provided an assist to help Solanke net his 22nd goal of the season. The following match-day, Lerma netted his first goal of the season in a 3–0 away victory against Huddersfield Town. On 18 April, Lerma once again provided an assist for Solanke, this time against Coventry which ended in a 0–3 away win. Following Bournemouth's impressive season, the team managed to secure a second-place league finish and were therefore promoted back to the Premier League after two seasons.

2022–23 season
On 6 August 2022, Lerma scored Bournemouth's first goal of the season during Premier League opening match-day as his team went on to defeat Aston Villa 2–0. Consequently, Lerma's goal became the fastest scored by a newly promoted side at one minute and 56 seconds. On October 15, Lerma scored his second goal of the season in a 2–2 draw at Fulham. He scored his third Premier League goal of the season on 25 February 2023, Bournemouth's sole goal in a 1–4 home defeat to Manchester City.

International career

On 14 July 2016, Lerma was called up by Colombia's Olympic manager Carlos Restrepo to compete at the 2016 Summer Olympics. In total, he appeared in three out of four matches as Colombia suffered elimination in the quarter-finals at the hands of the eventual gold-medalists Brazil.

Lerma made his debut for Colombia on 10 November 2017, coming on late for Stefan Medina in a 1–2 defeat to South Korea.

In June 2018, he was named in José Pékerman's final 23-man squad for the 2018 FIFA World Cup in Russia. He made his World Cup debut as a starter in Colombia's opening group-stage match against Japan, where Colombia lost 1–2 with Carlos Sánchez receiving a red card in the third minute of the match for a suspected handball. Lerma would go on to dispute all of Colombia's remaining matches as his country exited in the round of 16 after losing to England on penalties.

On 30 May 2019, Lerma was selected by manager Carlos Queiroz to represent Colombia at the 2019 Copa América. He made his tournament debut in Colombia's group-stage win against Argentina, coming off the bench for Juan Cuadrado and providing a 86th minute assist to Duván Zapata for Colombia's second goal which sealed a 2–0 victory. He started in Colombia's final group-stage match where Colombia beat Paraguay 1–0 to top their group with a perfect win rate and no goals conceded. For Colombia's quarter-final match against Chile, Lerma was an unused substitute; Colombia was eventually knocked out of the tournament after losing 4–5 on penalties.

On 13 October 2020, Lerma scored his first international goal in a 2022 FIFA World Cup qualification fixture over Chile, which ended 2–2.

For the 2021 Copa América, Lerma was left out of Colombia's final squad by recently appointed manager Reinaldo Rueda due to unknown personal circumstances. Furthermore, theories surrounding Lerma's absence suggested that Rueda was disappointed in Lerma's performance days before the list's announcement, during Colombia's World Cup qualifying match against Argentina; where Lerma was substituted off in the 30th minute after Colombia conceded two goals in just eight minutes. Although Colombia managed to recover and tie the game 2–2, matches in which Lerma appeared such as Colombia's 0–3 defeat at home against Uruguay and their 6–1 away loss against Ecuador that lead to the sacking of Carlos Queiroz, may have initiated internal conflicts within the squad, which could have cost Lerma a place in the Rueda's final list along with key players such as James Rodríguez and Radamel Falcao. In response to these rumours, the Colombian Football Federation came out with a statement denying any rumours regarding Lerma's exclusion and stated that the player's absence on the final list was due to an unnamed personal situation which has yet to be disclosed.

Career statistics

Club

International

Scores and results list Colombia's goal tally first.

Honours
AFC Bournemouth
Championship runner-up: 2021–22

References

External links

Profile at the AFC Bournemouth website

1994 births
Living people
Sportspeople from Valle del Cauca Department
Colombian footballers
Colombia international footballers
Association football midfielders
Atlético Huila footballers
Levante UD footballers
AFC Bournemouth players
Categoría Primera A players
La Liga players
Segunda División players
Premier League players
English Football League players
2018 FIFA World Cup players
2019 Copa América players
Olympic footballers of Colombia
Footballers at the 2016 Summer Olympics
Colombian expatriate footballers
Expatriate footballers in Spain
Colombian expatriate sportspeople in Spain